This paleobotany list records new fossil plant taxa that were to be described during the year 2012, as well as notes other significant paleobotany discoveries and events which occurred during 2012.

Bryophytes

Lycophytes

Marchantiophytes

Ferns and fern allies

Bennettitales

"Pteridospermatophytes"

Ginkgoales

Conifers

Araucariaceae

Cheirolepidiaceae

Cupressaceae

Pinaceae

Podocarpaceae

Taxaceae

Other conifers

Other gymnosperms

Angiosperms

References

2012 in paleontology
Paleobotany